Adanson's mud turtle (Pelusios adansonii) is a species of turtle in the family Pelomedusidae. The species is endemic to north-central Africa.

Taxonomy and etymology
August Friedrich Schweigger first described the turtle in 1812, based on remnants found in Senegal by French botanist Michel Adanson, for whom Schweigger named the new species as Emys andansonii.

Geographic range
P. adansonii is found in Benin, Cameroon, the Central African Republic, Chad, Ethiopia, Mali, Mauritania, Niger, Nigeria, Senegal, South Sudan, and Sudan. There are at least three distinct populations within the turtle's distribution.

Conservation status
Although Adanson's mud turtle does not seem to be at risk of becoming an endangered species, destruction of its habitat (largely due to farming) and hunting by humans have both reduced its population. Hunting by humans persists despite local laws forbidding the activity in some of the countries in which the turtle is found.

Characteristics
Adanson's mud turtle is a medium-sized turtle that lives in freshwater. The ventral part of the shell (plastron) is yellow.

Diet
Adanson's mud turtle is carnivorous. It eats mollusks, fish, and small amphibians.

Reserve
It is the first refuge of its kind that is dedicated to the conservation of Adanson's mud turtle and its nesting and foraging habits. It was created with the help of the Turtle Survival Alliance (TSA Africa) and the Ministry of Environment and Nature Protection of Senegal.

References

External links
 Pelusios adansonii (Schweigger 1812) – Adanson's mud turtle

Further reading
Schweigger [AF] (1812). "Prodromus Monographia Cheloniorum ". Königsberger Archiv für Naturwissenschaft und Mathematik 1: 271–368, 406–458. (Emys adansonii, new species, pp. 308–309). (in Latin).

Adanson's mud turtle
Reptiles of Ethiopia
Reptiles of South Sudan
Vertebrates of Chad
Reptiles of West Africa
Reptiles of Cameroon
Vertebrates of the Central African Republic
Vertebrates of Sudan
Adanson's mud turtle